UFC on Fox: VanZant vs. Waterson (also known as UFC on Fox 22) was a mixed martial arts event promoted by the Ultimate Fighting Championship and held on December 17, 2016, at Golden 1 Center in Sacramento, California.

Background
After previously contesting four events in Sacramento at Sleep Train Arena, this was the first for the promotion at the newly built venue.

A women's bout between Paige VanZant and former Invicta FC Atomweight Champion Michelle Waterson served as the event headliner.

The event featured the final fight of former WEC Featherweight Champion and UFC Bantamweight Championship title challenger Urijah Faber, as he faced Brad Pickett, until he made a comeback in 2019. 

As a result of the cancellation of UFC Fight Night: Lamas vs. Penn, bouts between James Moontasri vs. Alex Morono and Cole Miller vs. Mizuto Hirota were rescheduled for this event.

The event was televised on Fox, averaging 3.2 million viewers.

Results

Bonus awards
The following fighters were awarded $50,000 bonuses:
Fight of the Night: Leslie Smith vs. Irene Aldana
Performance of the Night: Michelle Waterson and Paul Craig

Reported payout
The following is the reported payout to the fighters as reported to the California State Athletic Commission. The total fighter payout for the event was $1,084,000. It does not include sponsor money and also does not include the UFC's traditional "fight night" bonuses.

 Michelle Waterson: $30,000 (includes $15,000 win bonus) def. Paige VanZant: $43,000
 Mickey Gall: $40,000 (includes $20,000 win bonus) def. Sage Northcutt: $60,000
 Urijah Faber: $320,000 (includes $160,000 win bonus) def. Brad Pickett: $40,000
 Alan Jouban: $54,000 (includes $27,000 win bonus) def. Mike Perry: $14,000
 Paul Craig: $20,000 (includes $10,000 win bonus) def. Luis Henrique da Silva: $14,000
 Mizuto Hirota: $34,000 (includes $17,000 win bonus) def. Cole Miller: $33,000
 Colby Covington: $54,000 (includes $27,000 win bonus) def. Bryan Barberena: $20,000
 Alex Morono: $30,000 (includes $15,000 win bonus) def. James Moontasri: $16,000 
 Josh Emmett: $28,000 (includes $14,000 win bonus) def. Scott Holtzman: $17,000
 Leslie Smith: $50,000 (includes $25,000 win bonus) def. Irene Aldana: $12,000
 Eddie Wineland: $58,000 (includes $29,000 win bonus) def. Takeya Mizugaki: $39,000
 Hector Sandoval: $24,000 (includes $12,000 win bonus) def. Fredy Serrano: $12,000
 Sultan Aliev: $20,000 (includes $10,000 win bonus) def. Bojan Veličković: $12,000

See also
List of UFC events
2016 in UFC

References

Fox UFC
2016 in mixed martial arts
Events in Sacramento, California
Mixed martial arts in Sacramento, California
Sports competitions in Sacramento, California
2016 in sports in California
December 2016 sports events in the United States